Dunham Run is a  long tributary to Pine Creek in Warren County, Pennsylvania.

Course
Dunham Run rises about 2 miles east of Dotyville, Pennsylvania in Warren County and then flows south to Pine Creek about 0.5 miles west of Enterprise, Pennsylvania.

Watershed
Dunham Run drains  of area, receives about 44.8 in/year of precipitation, and has a wetness index of 435.95 and is about 92% forested.

References

Additional Maps

Rivers of Pennsylvania
Rivers of Warren County, Pennsylvania